Stalag I-A was a German prisoner-of-war camp during World War II, located in the village of Stabławki (then officially Stablack). It housed mainly Polish, Belgian, French and Russian prisoners of war, but also Britons and Italians.

The camp was built in late 1939 by Polish prisoners of war, who were captured during the German-Soviet invasion of Poland which started World War II. In 1940 the Poles were joined by Belgian and French prisoners following the Fall of France, and by Russians in 1941 following the Operation Barbarossa. Some British and Italian prisoners were also there. On 25 January 1945, as Russian troops approached, the camp was abandoned and all prisoners were evacuated to the west.

Kommandos of Stalag I-A 
Few of the men registered at Stalag I-A were housed at the main camp, as most were assigned to Kommandos (sub-camps) spread over the entire district.

 E1, Central Camp
 E2, Stablack hospital
 E3, Königsberg
 E4, Heinrichswalde
 E5, around Königsberg
 E6, Königsberg
 E7, Wehlau
 E8, Preußisch Eylau
 E9, Heilsberg
 E10, Gerdauen
 E11, Heiligenbeil, sub-divided into five Zug; Heiligenbeil, Bladiau, Ludwigsort, Zitten and Lichtenfeld
 E12, Memel
 E13, Unknown
 E14, Labiau
 E16, Insterburg
 E17, Schlossberg
 E18, Gumbinnen
 E19, Ebenrode
 E20, Bartenstein
 E34, Tilsit / Ragnit
 E44, Union Giesserei locomotive plant, Königsberg
 E45, Angerapp

See also 
 List of prisoner-of-war camps in Germany

References

External links 
 Pegasus Archive photographs

World War II prisoner of war camps in Germany
World War II sites in Poland